The 36th edition of the Clásico RCN was held from Saturday March 16 to Monday March 25, 1996, in Colombia.

Stages

1996-03-16: Urena — Cúcuta (8 km)

1996-03-17: Cúcuta — Bucaramanga (210 km)

1996-03-18: Bucaramanga — Barbosa (210 km)

1996-03-19: Barbosa — Leona en Tocancipa (170 km)

1996-03-20: Cajica — Zipaquirá (172 km)

1996-03-21: Mosquera — Ibagué (185 km)

1996-03-22: Ibagué — Buga (207.9 km)

1996-03-23: Buga — Pereira (208 km)

1996-03-24: Santa Rosa de Cabal — Alto de Las Palmas (206 km)

1996-03-25: Medellín — Santa Helena (16 km)

Final classification

See also 
 1996 Vuelta a Colombia

References 
 cyclingnews

Clásico RCN
Clasico RCN
Clasico RCN